The Church of St Michael and All Angels is a Church of England parish church in Cookley, Suffolk. The church is a grade I listed building.

History
The church is Medieval. The tower dates to the 12th century. The nave is mainly 12th century with 15th century windows. The chancel likely dates to the 14th century. The church was altered in 1894 during the Victorian restoration.

On 7 December 1966, the church was designated a Grade I listed building.

Present day
St Michael's is part of the Benefice of Heveningham with Ubbeston, Huntingfield and Cookley in the Archdeaconry of Suffolk of the Diocese of St Edmundsbury and Ipswich.

As the parish rejects the ordination of women, it receives alternative episcopal oversight from the Bishop of Richborough (currently Norman Banks).

Interior
The original 15th Century rood screen was discovered in the 1930's by Munro Cautley, later diocesan surveyor for St Edmundsbury and Ipswich, making up part of a chicken shed in Huntingfield he brought it back to the church and it is now bolted to the wall on the south side of the chancel arch. A typical 15th Century East Anglian font with angels holding shields alternating with lions around the bowl stands at the West end of nave.

Bells
The church has a ring of 3 bells, two were cast by John Taylor & Co in 1893 the other by Thomas Gardiner of Sudbury in 1720. The tower is affiliated to the Suffolk Guild of Ringers.

References

External links
 
 A Church Near You entry

Cookley
Cookley
Cookley